National Tertiary Route 502, or just Route 502 (or ), known as , is a National Road Route of Costa Rica, located in the Heredia province, it is a road between Route 113 and Route 114.

Description
The route follows a hilly and tight road, and crosses the middle of the Getsemaní village, in San Rafael canton, while at the same time, partially draws the northeast limit of the Santa Lucía district of the Barva canton with San Rafael canton.

Since 2017, the local governments have asked the central government to improve the conditions of the road.

In Heredia province the route covers Barva canton (San Pablo, Santa Lucía districts), San Rafael canton (San Josecito district).

References

Highways in Costa Rica